Nenad Milunović (born 3 June 1983) is a Serbian football midfielder.

External links
 
 

1983 births
Living people
People from Aleksinac
Association football midfielders
Serbian footballers
FK Radnički Niš players
FK Napredak Kruševac players
FK Radnik Surdulica players
Serbian SuperLiga players